This is a list of Alabama A&M Bulldogs football players in the NFL Draft.

Key

Selections

References

Alabama AandM

Alabama AandM Bulldogs NFL Draft